Rivalta Bormida is a comune (municipality) in the Province of Alessandria in the Italian region Piedmont, located about  southeast of Turin and about  south of Alessandria.

Rivalta Bormida borders the following municipalities: Cassine, Castelnuovo Bormida, Montaldo Bormida, Orsara Bormida, Sezzadio, and Strevi.

Rivalta Bormida has a coat of arms composed by a tower in the centre with two bears one on each side sustaining the tower, the ground is represented by a green garden with a silver band representing the Bormida River.

References

Cities and towns in Piedmont